EuroSong 2006 may refer to two different events within the Eurovision frame:
 Eurovision Song Contest 2006, the annual pan-European event
 Eurosong '06, the Belgian and Flemish national selection